Golodass"Gol" means Rivine and "Das" means Barren Land in Khowar Language ,  is a village situated In District Ghizer Tehsil Punial Gilgit Baltistan. This village is at two hours distance from Gilgit City towards north west on inshkoman road. Golodass has an enriched culture with a diverse society. Raja of Punial, His Highness Raja Anwer Khan has repopulated this village after 1905. His palace is still situated in Golodass. Raja Mir Aman Khan was the first school teacher (Ustad) who started educating village people first time in the village. Most of the village people are his students. Languages spoken in Golodass are Burushaskhi, Shina, Khowar Language, and also Urdu. Nearby villages are Hatoon, Hasis, Gahkuch bala, Damas, and Silpi.

Golodass, with a population of 2,500 (Approx) people, is located in Punial Ghizer Gilgit Baltistan. The village was drowned in 1905 by heavy floods but resettled in 1935. Raja of Punial, His Highness Raja Anwer Khan extended the village by populating the barren upper portion of the village with help of Hub-e-Ali of Hunza in 1935. Raja Mir Aman Khan came here in 1960 and started to run its first school as only teacher in the village. The Residents of the village are all migrants from different parts of Gilgit region including  Yasin, Phander Valley, Hunza, Punial region, Gupis, Darel, Chilas, and other areas. Due to different backgrounds, there are a mixture of culture and languages in the village.

History 
Golodass was previously known as “Golo koi”. It was said that the sun couldn’t reach the ground because of its dense gardens but it was turned into desert when heavy floods hit the area in 1905 and drowned it. In 1928 and onwards the Raja of Punial, His Highness Raja Anwar Khan decided to populate the upper barren portion of the village. The difficult task was to bring water to the village though rocky mountains and sliding areas of Hindukush Terrains. The Raja tried twice to make a canal from Ishkoman river but failed. Then His Highness contacted Hub-e-Ali of Hunza who was an expert in making water channels. Hub-e-Ali accepted this offer from His Highness Raja Anwar Khan and Shifted to Golodass with his family. After so many difficulties and strong efforts Hub-e-Ali and other 13 members successfully build the canal in 1935. They stayed there with their family and work hard to turn this barren land into cultivation and started helping His Highness Raja Anwar Khan in populating the village. Many other people from Hunza also migrated to the village in later years. Raja Mir Aman Khan, was the first school teacher in the village, came here from Bubur Village Punial in 1965. He served and educated the people of this area more than thirty years up to 1997. Raja Mir Aman Khan introduced the Golodass with its second name Anwer Abad. Majority of population is from hunza and also are Gujurs. The Gujars of the village were brought by Rajas as their servants who are known for their hard work related to cattle production and forming. The people from Yasin and Phudar valley migrated there after the 1980s.

Travel 

Golodass Is almost Two Hours Distance from Gilgit City and a 20mints Distance from Gahkuch bala any one Can Reach Golodass Through Directly from Gilgit Using Ishkoman Road and Also From Gahkuch Bala to Reach Golodass From Gahkuch First have to cross Silpi Bridge and Local Transport Is available from silpi. Local Transport Is Available to any place .

Schools 
Schools in the area include:
 Govt. School Golodass
 Aga Khan Diamond Jubilee School
 Safe Public School
 Syed Alam Shaheed Public School
 Eagle Mountain School

Festivals 

Nouroz:
Nowruz(originally “New Day”). In Iranian calendars and the corresponding traditional celebrations. Nowruz is also widely referred to as the Persian New Year. Nowruz is celebrated and observed by Punialy people and the related cultural continent and has spread in many other parts of the world, including parts of Central Asia, Caucasus, South Asia, Northwestern China, the Crimea and some groups in the Balkans. Nowruz marks the first day of spring and the beginning of the year in Iranian calendar. It is celebrated on the day of the astronomical vernal equinox, which usually occurs on March 21 or the previous/following day depending on where it is observed.

geenani:
It is celebrates when the wheat is ripened and fully ready to harvest. It is very old tradition to welcome the grains of wheat at homes. The people feel very happy on this cultural day. In the early morning all the people wake up and after having breakfast they get ready to celebrate the ginani. The aged men or women of the village gather at a place and come to wheat fields. From the fields they get some grains of wheat and put them into a bow having full of “diltar”. After that one by one they take a sip of Lasi in a wooden spoon. Women makes different dishes at homes especially rice, meat or chicken. A local dish is prepared on this day is “giyaling”,wisken is eaten by dipping it in melted butter. Giyaling is very tasty dish and all the people like it very much. Also people celebrate very much on this day.

DumanKhiya:
The second most crop of the Punial is Maize. It is cultivated in the mid of May and harvested in October. As the weather becomes cold after the month of October and crop is also ready to harvest in this month. When all the fields become empty at the end of October, people let their animals to fees on the open fields. No one is restricted to move on any field. All the animals are freely feed on the fields. After one week this cultural day is celebrated. Women make different local dishes on this day especially “GhoomFullai”.

Festival Foods:
Diram
Sharbat
Mull
Giyaling (with Dasi gee)
Geenani
Shairashapic
Desi Ghee
Desi Oil
DiramFiti
Harisa
Diltar
Chamuriki
Chakah
Burus shapick
Dishao
Hala Sheer
Chayee

Fruits  

The valley Of Golodass produces fresh and dry fruits, including:

Fresh Fruits 

 Apple
 Pomegranate
 Cherry
 Pear
 Grapes
 Apricot
 Almond 
 Peach
 Raspberry

Dry Fruits 

 Almond
 Walnuts
 Apricot kernels
 Dried apricot
 Kilao

References

Populated places in Ghizer District